WOKB (1680 kHz) is a commercial AM radio station licensed to Winter Garden, Florida, and serving Greater Orlando.  The station is owned by Shanti Persaud, through licensee Unity Broadcasting LLC.  It broadcasts an urban gospel radio format with some Christian talk and teaching programs.

By day, WOKB is powered at 10,000 watts. But to avoid interfering with other stations on 1680 AM, at night it reduces power to 1,000 watts.

History

WOKB originated as the expanded band "twin" of the original WOKB on the standard AM band.

On March 17, 1997, the Federal Communications Commission (FCC) announced that 88 stations had been given permission to move to newly available "Expanded Band" transmitting frequencies, ranging from 1610 to 1700 kHz, with WOKB in Winter Garden authorized to move from 1600 to 1680 kHz. A Construction Permit for the expanded band station was assigned the call letters WTIR on April 12, 1999.

The FCC's initial policy was that both the original station and its expanded band counterpart could operate simultaneously for up to five years, after which owners would have to turn in one of the two licenses, depending on whether they preferred the new assignment or elected to remain on the original frequency. However, this deadline has been extended multiple times, and both stations have remained authorized. One restriction is that the FCC has generally required paired original and expanded band stations to remain under common ownership.

On May 9, 2003, the call letters on 1680 AM were changed to WLAA. On May 6, 2008, the two stations on 1600 and 1680 AM swapped call letters, with WLAA moved to 1600 AM, and WOKB transferred to the expanded band station on 1680 AM.

References

External links

OKB (AM)
OKB (AM)